Pascal Bruckner (born 15 December 1948, in Paris) is a French writer, one of the "New Philosophers" who came to prominence in the 1970s and 1980s. Much of his work has been devoted to critiques of French society and culture.

Biography
Bruckner attended Jesuit schools in his youth.

After studies at the universities of Paris I and Paris VII Diderot, and then at the École Pratique des Hautes Études, Bruckner became maître de conférences at the Institut d'Études Politiques de Paris and a contributor to the Nouvel Observateur.

Bruckner began writing in the vein of the nouveaux philosophes or New Philosophers. He published Parias (Parias), Lunes de fiel (Evil Angels) (adapted as a film by Roman Polanski) and Les voleurs de beauté (The Beauty Stealers) (Prix Renaudot in 1997). Among his essays are La tentation de l'innocence ("The Temptation of Innocence," Prix Médicis in 1995) and, famously, Le Sanglot de l'Homme blanc (The Tears of the White Man), an attack on narcissistic and destructive policies intended to benefit the Third World, and more recently La tyrannie de la pénitence (2006), a book on the West's endless self-criticism, translated as "The Tyranny of Guilt" (2010).

From 1992 to 1999, Bruckner was a supporter of the Croatian, Bosnian and Kosovar causes in the Yugoslav Wars, and endorsed the NATO bombing of Yugoslavia in 1999. In 2003, he supported the toppling of Saddam Hussein, but later criticized the mistakes of the U.S. military and the use of torture in Abu Ghraib and Guantanamo.

In 2009, he signed a petition in support of Roman Polanski, calling for his release after Polanski was arrested in Switzerland in relation to his 1977 charge for drugging and raping a 13-year-old girl.

Le Sanglot de l'Homme blanc

Le Sanglot de l'Homme blanc (The White Man's Tears), published by the Éditions le Seuil in May 1983, was a controversial opus. The author describes what he sees as the anti-Western and pro-Third-World sentimentalism of some of the Left in the West. The essay had an influence on a whole trend of thought, especially on Maurice Dantec and Michel Houellebecq. The title is a variation on Kipling's "White Man's Burden".

La tyrannie de la pénitence

Bruckner's 2006 work La Tyrannie de la Pénitence: Essai sur le Masochisme Occidental (The Tyranny of Guilt: An Essay on Western Masochism) focuses on the origin and political impact of the contemporary political culture of Western guilt.

Criticism of multicultural ethnocentrism

Bruckner's polemic stance against the ethnocentric nature of some discourses of multiculturalism has kindled an international debate. In an article titled "Enlightenment Fundamentalism or Racism of the Anti-Racists?", he defended Ayaan Hirsi Ali  in particular against the criticisms from Ian Buruma and Timothy Garton Ash. According to Bruckner, modern philosophers from Heidegger to Gadamer, Derrida, Max Horkheimer and Theodor Adorno have mounted a broad attack on the Enlightenment, claiming that "all the evils of our epoch were spawned by this philosophical and literary episode: capitalism, colonialism, totalitarianism." Bruckner agrees that the history of the twentieth century attests to the potential of modernity for fanaticism, but argues that the modern thought that issued from the Enlightenment proved capable of criticizing its own errors, and that "Denouncing the excesses of the Enlightenment in the concepts that it forged means being true to its spirit."

Books
Parias: roman, Seuil, 1985, .
Lunes de fiel: roman, Seuil, 1981, .
Evil angels: a novel, Grove Press, 1987, .
Les Voleurs de beauté: roman, B. Grasset, 1997.
Le divin enfant: roman, Seuil, 1992, .
The Divine Child, Rupa & Co., 2005, .
La tentation de l'innocence, Grasset, 1995, .

Le Sanglot de l'Homme blanc, Éditions du Seuil, 1983; Simon & Schuster, 1986, .
The Tears of the White Man: Compassion As Contempt, The Free Press, 1986, .
La Tyrannie de la Pénitence: Essai sur le Masochisme Occidental (The Tyranny of Guilt: An Essay on Westerm Masochism), Grasset, 2006, .

The Fanaticism of the Apocalypse: Save the Earth, Punish Human Beings, translator Steven Rendall = .
The Paradox of Love, translator Steven Rendall,  Princeton University Press, 2012,  .
Has Marriage for Love Failed?, translators Steven Rendall and Lisa Neal, Polity Books, 2013, .
An Imaginary Racism: Islamophobia and Guilt, translator Steven Rendall, Cambridge, UK, Medford, MA, Polity Books, 2018. 
They Stole our Beauty, translator Stuart Bell, The 87 Press, 2019.

References

External links
The Asterix complex, interview with Pascal Bruckner at signandsight.com
 
 Boycott Durban II By Pascal Bruckner, 16 June 2008
 Philosophy: Pushing the Limits. An Interview with Pascal Bruckner. Listen or download Bruckner interviewed by JK Fowler on February 26, 2011.
 On Islamic Terrorism: Interview for Croatian Television, November 2015 (French). http://www.hrt.hr/309915/vijesti/bruckner-za-hrt-dio-francuskih-muslimana-odlucio-se-odcijepiti-od-drustva

Writers from Paris
1948 births
Living people
20th-century French novelists
20th-century French male writers
21st-century French novelists
French critics of Islam
Critics of multiculturalism
French agnostics
Prix Médicis essai winners
Prix Renaudot winners
French male essayists
French male novelists
20th-century French essayists
21st-century French essayists
21st-century French male writers
New Philosophers